Vermont Route 10 (VT 10) is a state highway located in Windsor County, Vermont, United States. The western terminus of the  road is at VT 103 in Chester and the eastern terminus is at VT 106 in Springfield.

Route description
VT 10 begins at VT 103 south of the community of Gassetts in the town of Chester. From there the road winds its way eastward into the town of Springfield, where it terminates at VT 106 in North Springfield. The Hartness State Airport is located just northeast of the eastern end of VT 10 on VT 106.

Major intersections

References

External links

010
Transportation in Windsor County, Vermont